Fredy Arber (born 24 August 1928) is a Swiss cyclist. He competed in the men's tandem and 1,000 metres time trial events at the 1952 Summer Olympics.

References

External links
 

1928 births
Possibly living people
Swiss male cyclists
Olympic cyclists of Switzerland
Cyclists at the 1952 Summer Olympics
Place of birth missing (living people)